Royal Air Force Funtington or more simply RAF Funtington is a former Royal Air Force Advanced Landing Ground located in West Sussex, England.

History

The following units were here at some point:

The following units were also here at some point:

Current use

The site has been reverted to farmland.

References

Citations

Bibliography

Funtington